Jackson Creek may refer to:

In Australia
Jackson Creek (Victoria), a watercourse of the Port Phillip catchment in Victoria

In Canada
Jackson Creek (Alberta)
Jackson Creek (Toronto)
Jackson Creek (Peterborough, Ontario)

In the United States
Jackson Creek, in Oregon
Jackson Creek (Dry Creek), in California
Jackson Creek (Monroe County, Indiana), in Indiana
Jackson Creek (Sprout Creek), in New York
Jackson Creek (Uwharrie River tributary), a stream in Randolph County, North Carolina
Little Swatara Creek, once known as Jackson Creek, in Pennsylvania